Trumpet Winsock is a TCP/IP stack for Windows 3.x that implemented the Winsock API, which is an API for network sockets. It was developed by Peter Tattam from Trumpet Software International and distributed as shareware software.

History 
The first version, 1.0A, was released in 1994. It rapidly gained reputation as the best tool for connecting to the internet. Guides for internet connectivity commonly advised to use Trumpet Winsock. The author received very little financial compensation for developing the software. In 1996, a 32-bit version was released.

Lawsuit 
In the Trumpet Software Pty Ltd. v OzEmail Pty Ltd. case, the defendant had distributed Trumpet Winsock for free with a magazine. It did also suppress notices that the software was developed by Trumpet Software.

Replacement by Microsoft 
Windows 95 includes an IPv4 stack but it is not installed by default.  An early version of this IPv4 stack, codenamed Wolverine, was released by Microsoft for Windows for Workgroups in 1994.  Microsoft also released Internet Explorer 5 for Windows 3.x with an included dialer application for calling the modem pool of a dial-up Internet service provider.  The Wolverine stack does not include a dialer but another computer on the same LAN may make a dialed connection or a dialer not included with Wolverine may be used on the computer using Wolverine.

Architecture 
The binary for Trumpet Winsock is called TCPMAN.EXE. Other files included the main winsock.dll and three UCSC connection .cmd file scripts.

References

External links 
 
Internet Archive - Trumpet Winsock
 Winworld - Trumpet Winsock
 Cyber Harvard - Using Trumpet On Netcruiser Accounts

Network socket
1994 software
History of the Internet
Windows communication and services